Alaska Taufa (born 24 July 1983) is a Tongan rugby union footballer. His usual position is on the wing. He was part of the Tongan squad at the 2011 Rugby World Cup where he played in one match. He has also signed with French club Oyonnax for the 2015 season. He is the son of Alasika Taufa, who was also a Tongan international in the 1995 Rugby World Cup.

References

External links 
 
 

1983 births
Living people
Tongan rugby union players
Tonga international rugby union players
People from Tongatapu
Oyonnax Rugby players
FC Grenoble players
Tongan expatriate rugby union players
Tongan expatriate sportspeople in France
Expatriate rugby union players in France
Rugby union wings